The Battle of Kautla (Kautla veresaun or Kautla veretöö) was a battle between Soviet destruction battalions and Estonian Forest Brothers in Kautla, Estonia in July 1941. It included series of murders of civilians committed by destruction battalions, known as Kautla massacre.

On 24 July 1941, an extermination battalion murdered Gustav and Rosalie Viljamaa of Simisalu farm and set the farm on fire. In the coming days, the extermination battalion undertook the systematic murder of all civilians in the region and burning their farms. The Kautla farm was burned down by the Red Army with the family and staff inside, thus constituting a murder of Johannes Lindemann, Oskar Mallene, Ida Hallorava, Arnold Kivipõld, Alfred Kukk and Johannes Ummus. In total, more than twenty people, all civilians, were murdered — many of them after torture — and tens of farms destroyed. The low toll of human deaths in comparison with the number of burned farms is due to the Erna long-range reconnaissance group breaking the Red Army blockade on the area, allowing many civilians to escape.

See also 

 Soviet war crimes

 Bucha massacre (2022)

References 

Soviet World War II crimes
1941 in Estonia
1941 in the Soviet Union
Massacres in Estonia
Massacres in the Soviet Union
NKVD
Massacres committed by the Soviet Union
Mass murder in 1941
July 1941 events
Russian war crimes in Estonia